Leonid Ivanovych Hlibov (5 March 1827 – 10 November 1893) was a Ukrainian poet, writer, teacher, and civic figure.

Life
Hlibov was born in Veselyi Podil, Khorol county, Poltava gubernia. He graduated from the Nizhyn Lyceum in 1855. In 1858 he began to teach at the gymnasia in Chornyi Ostriv and Chernihiv. He was active in the Chernihiv Hromada, published educational books, and contributed to the Saint Petersburg Ukrainian journal Osnova.

In 1861 he founded and became editor of the weekly newspaper Chernigovskii listok, in which he published some of his works. In 1863 the Russian authorities closed down the paper and banned his works. Hlibov was then fired from his teaching job and was forced to live under police surveillance. From 1867 to his death he was the director of the Chernihiv zemstvo printing house. He died in Chernihiv.

Works
Hlibov wrote over 40 romantic lyric poems in the Ukrainian language.  His poem 'Zhurba' (Sorrow), was used by Mykola Lysenko and has become a popular Ukrainian folk song.

His most important and notable works are his 107 fables. These are written in the vernacular and satirize contemporary life and conditions using Ukrainian motifs and folklore. Hlibov also wrote riddles for children.

References

External links
 
 

1827 births
1893 deaths
People from Poltava Oblast
People from Khorolsky Uyezd
Ukrainian male poets
Ukrainian editors
Ukrainian educators
19th-century Ukrainian poets
19th-century male writers
Nizhyn Gogol State University alumni